Kriveni is a village in the northern part of Resen Municipality in North Macedonia.

History 
Just east of the present-day village lies an archaeological site from Late Antiquity, known as Češino. Another site within the village's territory dates from the Roman era.

Demographics 
Kriveni has 27 inhabitants as of the most recent census of 2002, having suffered a sharp population decline in the past several decades.

Religion
Kriveni has one church, dedicated to St George.

People from Kriveni 
Pande Božinovski, soldier in the Spanish Civil War
Gero Resenski (? - 1905), member of the Internal Macedonian Revolutionary Organization
Krste Stojanov (1880 - 1905), member of the Internal Macedonian Revolutionary Organization

References 

Villages in Resen Municipality